The Cape Government Railways Railmotor of 1906 was a South African steam railmotor locomotive from the pre-Union era in the Cape of Good Hope.

In 1906, the Cape Government Railways acquired a single self-contained Railmotor for low-volume passenger service. The railmotor was a  side-tank locomotive with a passenger coach on a single bogie as an integral part of the locomotive itself.

Manufacturer
A single railmotor was delivered to the Cape Government Railways (CGR) in 1906. The railmotor was a self-contained motor-coach in which the locomotive and coach were embodied in a single vehicle, with a driver's station at the rear end of the coach for reverse running. The locomotive part was a 0-4-0 side-tank engine which was built by North British Locomotive Company, while the coach part was built by Metropolitan Amalgamated Railway Carriage & Wagon. It was the first steam railmotor to enter service on the CGR and was allocated the number 6, later M6.

Of the earlier vehicles in the CGR number range from M1 to M5, four were smaller petrol or petrol-electric railmotors. No. M4 was a track inspection trolley which was not used in revenue service.

Layout
The coach consisted of four sections, a compartment adjacent to the engine which could seat thirty 3rd class passengers, a central compartment which could seat sixteen 2nd class passengers, a third compartment containing two benches across the width of the coach, and a driving compartment at the rear end. To negotiate curves and points, the power unit of the locomotive pivoted like a bogie.

Service

Cape Government Railways
The railmotor was intended for low-volume passenger service and was initially placed in service on the Franschhoek branch line. In its later years the railmotor worked a shuttle service between Bellville and Salt River.

South African Railways
When the Union of South Africa was established on 31 May 1910, the three Colonial government railways (CGR, Natal Government Railways and Central South African Railways) were united under a single administration to control and administer the railways, ports and harbours of the Union. Although the South African Railways and Harbours came into existence in 1910, the actual classification and renumbering of all the rolling stock of the three constituent railways were only implemented with effect from 1 January 1912.

In 1912, the railmotor was taken onto the SAR roster as an unclassified locomotive and was excluded from the renumbering schedules.

Withdrawal
The railmotor's advantage of easy reversing without the need to run a locomotive around at terminals, which would require a passing loop, was offset by the major disadvantage that any down-time for locomotive maintenance placed the entire vehicle out of service. This was possibly the reason why the railmotor did not have a long service life and was withdrawn from service in 1918.

Illustration
The interior layout of the railmotor is illustrated by the Metropolitan Amalgamated Railway Carriage & Wagon drawing of the vehicle.

References

0410
0410
0-4-0+4 locomotives
B-2 locomotives
B2 locomotives
NBL locomotives
Cape gauge railway locomotives
Railway locomotives introduced in 1906
1906 in South Africa
Scrapped locomotives